Tiffany Lawrence is a former Democratic member of the West Virginia House of Delegates, representing the 65th district. Lawrence is a former Miss West Virginia.

Lawrence was elected to the Legislature in 2008 and served three terms. In the 2014 election, despite raising more money for her campaign than any other candidate in her region of the state, Lawrence was defeated by Republican challenger Jill Upson.

References

External links
 
Legislative page

Living people
Democratic Party members of the West Virginia House of Delegates
1982 births
Politicians from Martinsburg, West Virginia
Shepherd University alumni
Shenandoah University alumni
Miss America 2006 delegates
Women state legislators in West Virginia
People from Charles Town, West Virginia
Beauty pageant contestants from West Virginia
21st-century American politicians
21st-century American women politicians